Tephritis stictica is a species of tephritid or fruit flies in the genus Tephritis of the family Tephritidae.

Distribution
Southern Europe.

References

Tephritinae
Insects described in 1862
Diptera of Europe